Fabian Schönheim (born 14 February 1987) is a German professional footballer who plays as a defender. He is a free agent.

Early career
After spending the first part of his youth career with local side Rehborn, Schönheim signed for Kaiserslautern and played in their youth team for a further four years. He then, in 2005, began in the first team aged 18. He went on to make nearly 50 league appearances for the club and the reserves. He was at the club when they were relegated from the Bundesliga in the 2005–06 season.

Club career

SV Wehen Wiesbaden
He joined newly relegated 3. Liga side Wehen Wiesbaden. He played a big role at the club for two seasons, played in 74 league games and scored 4 times.

Mainz 05
The defender then moved to 1. FSV Mainz 05 in 2011 but struggled to break into the first team and only played ten games for  the reserve side.

Union Berlin
The following season Schönheim joined 2. Bundesliga outfit Union Berlin. He has been involved in many unsuccessful promotion pushes since joining and has now played more than 100 games for the club. He has also spent the majority of his professional career at Union and scored 5 goals.

International career
Schönheim made six appearances at U-19 level for Germany. He also played ten times at U-21 level.

External links
 
 

1987 births
Living people
People from Bad Kreuznach (district)
German footballers
Germany under-21 international footballers
Germany youth international footballers
Association football defenders
Bundesliga players
2. Bundesliga players
3. Liga players
1. FC Kaiserslautern players
1. FC Kaiserslautern II players
SV Wehen Wiesbaden players
SV Wehen Wiesbaden II players
1. FSV Mainz 05 players
1. FSV Mainz 05 II players
1. FC Union Berlin players
Footballers from Rhineland-Palatinate